Elfed is a Welsh language place name and personal name. It commonly refers to one of two geographic areas:

The Kingdom of Elfed (English: Elmet), an Old Welsh kingdom in what is now northern England during the Early Middle Ages
 Elfed, a cymwd (commote) of Cantref Gwarthaf (in modern Carmarthenshire, Wales), later anglicised to 'Elvet Hundred'

Elfed may also refers to:

Cynwyl Elfed, a community in the cymwd of Elfed, Wales
Elfed High School, in Buckley, Flintshire, Wales
Elfed Davies, Baron Davies of Penrhys (1913–1992), Welsh politician
Elfed Evans (1926–1988), Welsh professional footballer
Howell Elvet Lewis hymn-writer, poet and Archdruid whose bardic name was Elfed
Elfed Morris (born 1942), Welsh professional footballer